The Low Countries Cup was an ice hockey tournament consisting of teams from the Netherlands and Belgium. The tournament was played from 1995–1999 and from 2003–2006.

Champions

References

Defunct ice hockey competitions in Europe
Low
Low